John Frederick Bohler (April 14, 1885 – July 12, 1960) was an American athlete, coach, and college athletics administrator.  He served as the head basketball coach at the State College of Washington in Pullman, now Washington State University, from 1908 to 1926, compiling a record of 226–177.

Bohler's 1916–17 team finished the season with a 25–1 record, and was retroactively named the national champion by the Helms Athletic Foundation and the Premo-Porretta Power Poll. Bohler  was also the head baseball coach at Washington State from 1916 to 1920, tallying a mark of 47–27–1.

The Bohler Gymnasium, opened on the WSC campus in 1928, was named for him in 1946.  He was the older brother of George Bohler and Roy Bohler, also college coaches. 

Bohler served on the city council in Pullman and was its mayor from 1948 to 1951. In 1950, he became the manager of the new Memorial Stadium in Spokane,  which was renamed Joe Albi Stadium in 1962. Bohler died in Pullman at age 75, and is buried at its city cemetery.

References

External links
 Fred Bohler at College Basketball at Sports-Reference.com
 Washington State University Libraries – John Frederick Bohler Papers
 

1885 births
1960 deaths
Basketball coaches from Pennsylvania
Mayors of places in Washington (state)
Sportspeople from Reading, Pennsylvania
Washington State Cougars athletic directors
Washington State Cougars baseball coaches
Washington State Cougars men's basketball coaches